Shangri-La Hotel, Singapore is a five-star deluxe hotel located on Orange Grove Road, off Orchard Road, Singapore.

Opened on 23 April 1971, the hotel is the first hotel of Shangri-La Hotels and Resorts. The hotel has 747 guestrooms and suites spread over the Tower Wing, Garden Wing, and Valley Wing, 127 serviced apartments, and 55 condominium units.

The hotel is the annual host of a meeting of defense ministers, permanent heads of ministries, and military chiefs of 28 Asia-Pacific states since 2002 that has become known as the Shangri-La Dialogue. On 7 November 2015, the hotel served as the venue of a historic meeting between the People's Republic of China's paramount leader Xi Jinping and the Republic of China's President Ma Ying-jeou, the first meeting between a Mainland China's and Taiwan's leader since the 1949 Chinese Communist Revolution.

Tower Wing 
The Tower Wing, which opened in 1971, is the hotel's main wing and houses the deluxe rooms, executive rooms, Horizon Club rooms, and Horizon Premier Suite. Besides the rooms and suites, the majority of the dining outlets in the hotel are located in the Tower Wing.

Garden Wing 

The Garden Wing opened in 1978. In 2011, the Garden Wing closed for renovation and reopened on 31 May 2012 after eight months of renovation which cost S$68 million.

Restaurants at the hotel 
The food and beverage outlets at Shangri-La Hotel Singapore are operated by the same management.

The Shangri-La Dialogue  
The IISS Asia Security Summit: The Shangri-La Dialogue, or also called "Shangri-La Dialogue," is a "Track One" inter-governmental security forum held annually by an independent think tank, the International Institute for Strategic Studies, which is attended by various officials of 28 Asia-Pacific states and has been held at the Shangri-La Hotel since 2002.

The special event area for Trump-Kim Summit  
The hotel was part of the special event area for Trump–Kim summit. On 3 June 2018, a "special event area" was declared around the Shangri-La Hotel Singapore, Capella Singapore, and extra security measures were in force from 10 to 14 June 2018.

References

External links 

Shangri-La Hotel, Singapore Official Website

Hotel buildings completed in 1971
Hotels established in 1971
Skyscraper hotels in Singapore
Orchard Road
Shangri-La Hotels and Resorts
Tanglin
Singaporean companies established in 1971
20th-century architecture in Singapore